Pan Am Flight 103 (PA103/PAN103) was a regularly scheduled Pan Am transatlantic flight from Frankfurt to Detroit via a stopover in London and another in New York City. The transatlantic leg of the route was operated by Clipper Maid of the Seas, a Boeing 747-121 registered N739PA. Shortly after 19:00 on 21 December 1988, while the aircraft was in flight over the Scottish town of Lockerbie, it was destroyed by a bomb that had been planted on board, killing all 243 passengers and 16 crew in what became known as the Lockerbie bombing. Large sections of the aircraft crashed in a residential street in Lockerbie, killing 11 residents. With a total of 270 fatalities, it is the deadliest terrorist attack in the history of the United Kingdom, as well as its deadliest aviation disaster.

Following a three-year joint investigation by Dumfries and Galloway Constabulary and the US Federal Bureau of Investigation (FBI), arrest warrants were issued for two Libyan nationals in November 1991. In 1999, Libyan leader Muammar Gaddafi handed over the two men for trial at Camp Zeist, the Netherlands, after protracted negotiations and UN sanctions. In 2001, Abdelbaset al-Megrahi, a Libyan intelligence officer, was jailed for life after being found guilty of 270 counts of murder in connection with the bombing. In August 2009, he was released by the Scottish government on compassionate grounds after being diagnosed with prostate cancer. He died in May 2012 as the only person to be convicted for the attack.

In 2003, Gaddafi accepted Libya's responsibility for the Lockerbie bombing and paid compensation to the families of the victims, although he maintained that he had never given the order for the attack. Acceptance of responsibility was part of a series of requirements laid out by a UN resolution for sanctions against Libya to be lifted. Libya said it had to accept responsibility due to Megrahi's status as a government employee.

During the First Libyan Civil War in 2011, former Minister of Justice Mustafa Abdul Jalil claimed that the Libyan leader had personally ordered the bombing, while investigators have long believed that Megrahi did not act alone, and have been reported as questioning retired Stasi agents about a possible role in the attack.

Some relatives of the dead, including  Lockerbie campaigner Jim Swire, believe the bomb was planted at Heathrow Airport, and not sent via feeder flights from Malta, as per the US and UK governments. A sleeper cell belonging to the Popular Front for the Liberation of Palestine (General Command) had been operating in West Germany in the months before the Pan Am bombing.

In 2020, US authorities indicted the Tunisia resident and Libyan national Abu Agila Mohammad Mas'ud Kheir Al-Marimi, who was 37 years old at the time of the incident for participating in the bombing, and in December 2022, they obtained custody of him.

Aircraft

The aircraft operating Pan Am Flight 103 was a Boeing 747-121, registered  and named Clipper Maid of the Seas; prior to 1979, it had been named Clipper Morning Light. It was the 15th 747 built, and was delivered in February 1970, one month after the first 747 entered service with Pan Am. In 1978, as Clipper Morning Light, it had appeared in "Conquering the Atlantic", the fourth episode of the BBC Television documentary series Diamonds in the Sky, presented by Julian Pettifer.

Flight
Pan Am 103 originated as a feeder flight at Frankfurt Airport, West Germany, using a Boeing 727 and the flight number PA103-A. Both Pan Am and TWA routinely changed the type of aircraft operating different legs of a flight. PA103 was bookable as either a single Frankfurt–New York or a Frankfurt–Detroit itinerary, though a scheduled change of aircraft took place in London's Heathrow Airport. 

After the bombing, the flight number was changed, in accordance with standard practice among airlines after disasters. Within days, the Frankfurt–London–New York–Detroit route was being served by Pan Am Flight 3 until the company's demise in 1991.

Explosion and collision timeline

Departure

On its arrival at Heathrow Terminal 3 on the day of the disaster, the passengers and their luggage (as well as an unaccompanied suitcase which was part of the interline luggage on the feeder flight) were transferred directly to Clipper Maid of the Seas, whose previous flight had originated in Los Angeles and arrived via San Francisco. The plane, which operated the flight's transatlantic leg, pushed back from the terminal at 18:04 and took off from runway 27R at 18:25, bound for New York JFK Airport and then Detroit Metropolitan Wayne County Airport. Contrary to many popular accounts of the disaster (though repeated, with reference, below), the flight, which had a scheduled gate departure time of 18:00, left Heathrow airport on time.

Loss of contact
At 18:58, the aircraft established two-way radio contact with Shanwick Oceanic Area Control in Prestwick on 123.95 MHz.

Clipper Maid of the Seas approached the corner of the Solway Firth at 19:01, and crossed the coast at 19:02 UTC. On scope, the aircraft showed transponder code, or "squawk", 0357 and flight level 310.

At 19:02:44, Alan Topp, the clearance delivery officer at Shanwick, transmitted its oceanic route clearance. The aircraft did not acknowledge this message. Clipper Maid of the Seas "squawk" then flickered off. Air traffic control  tried to make contact with the flight, with no response. Then a loud noise was recorded on the cockpit voice recorder (CVR) at 19:02:50. Five radar echoes fanning out appeared, instead of one. Comparison of the CVR to the radar returns showed that, eight seconds after the explosion, the wreckage had a  spread. A British Airways pilot, flying the London–Glasgow shuttle near Carlisle, called Scottish authorities to report that he could see a huge fire on the ground.

Disintegration of aircraft

The explosion punched a 50 cm (20 in) hole on the left side of the fuselage. Investigators from the US Federal Aviation Administration (FAA) concluded that no emergency procedures had been started in the cockpit. The CVR, located in the tail section of the aircraft, was found in a field by police searchers within 24 hours. No distress call was recorded; a 180-millisecond hissing noise could be heard as the explosion destroyed the aircraft's communications center. The explosion in the aircraft hold was magnified by the uncontrolled decompression of the fuselage - a large difference in pressure between the aircraft's interior and exterior. The aircraft's elevator- and rudder-control cables had been disrupted and the fuselage pitched downwards and to the left.

Investigators from the Air Accidents Investigation Branch of the British Department for Transport concluded that the nose of the aircraft was blown off and separated from the main fuselage within three seconds of the explosion. The nose cone was briefly held on by a band of metal, but facing aft, like the lid of a can. It then sheared off, up, and backwards to starboard, striking off the number-three engine and landing some distance outside the town, on a hill in Tundergarth.

Fuselage impact
The fuselage continued moving forward and down until it reached , when its dive became nearly vertical. Due to the extreme flutter, the vertical stabilizer disintegrated, which in turn produced large yawing movements. As the forward fuselage continued to disintegrate, the flying debris tore off both of the horizontal stabilizers, while the rear fuselage, the remaining three engines, and the fin torque box separated. The rear fuselage, parts of the baggage hold, and three landing gear units landed at Rosebank Crescent. The fuselage consisting of the main wing box structure landed in Sherwood Crescent, destroying three homes and creating a large impact crater. The  of jet fuel ignited by the impact started fires, which destroyed several additional houses. Investigators determined that both wings had landed in the Sherwood Crescent crater, saying, "the total absence of debris from the wing primary structure found remote from the crater confirmed the initial impression that the complete wing box structure had been present at the main impact."

This field, located opposite Tundergarth Church, is where the wreckage most easily identified with images of the accident in the media fell, having fallen "almost flat on its left side, but with a slight nose-down attitude."

Victims
 

All 243 passengers and 16 crew members were killed, as were 11 residents of Lockerbie on the ground. Of the 270 total fatalities, 190 were American citizens and 43 were British citizens. Nineteen other nationalities were represented, with four or fewer passengers per country.

Crew
Flight 103 was under the command of Captain James B. MacQuarrie (55), a Pan Am pilot since 1964 with almost 11,000 flight hours, of which over 4,000 had been accrued in 747 aircraft. He previously served three years in the U.S. Navy and five years in the Massachusetts Air National Guard, where he held the rank of major. First Officer Raymond R. Wagner (52), a pilot with Pan Am since 1966 with almost 5,500   hours in the 747 and a total of nearly 12,000 hours, had previously served eight years in the New Jersey National Guard. Flight Engineer Jerry D. Avritt (46), who joined Pan Am in 1980 after 13 years with National Airlines, had more than 8,000 hours of flying time, with nearly 500 hours in the 747. The cockpit crew was based at JFK.

Six of the 13 cabin crew members became naturalized US citizens while working for Pan Am. The cabin crew was based at Heathrow and lived in the London area or commuted from around Europe. All were originally hired by Pan Am and seniority ranged from 9 months to 28 years.

The captain, first officer, flight engineer, a flight attendant and several first-class passengers were found still strapped to their seats inside the nose section when it crashed in Tundergarth. A flight attendant was found alive by a farmer's wife, but died before help could be summoned. Some passengers may have remained alive briefly after impact; a pathologist's report concluded that at least two of these passengers might have survived if they had been found soon enough.

Passengers

Syracuse University students
Thirty-five of the passengers were students from Syracuse University, who participated in the university's Division of International Programs Abroad (abbreviated as "DIPA Program" and renamed to "Syracuse University Abroad" in 2006, while also known as "Syracuse Abroad" and "Study Abroad Program") and were returning home for Christmas following a semester in Syracuse's London and European campuses. Ten of these students were from other universities and colleges (including but not limited to Colgate University and University of Colorado) with collaborative relationships with Syracuse.

Many of their bodies were found at Rosebank Crescent,  from Sherwood Crescent. The rear fuselage of the plane, where many of them sat, destroyed one of the houses of Rosebank Crescent, 71 Park Place, the home of Lockerbie resident Ella Ramsden, who survived. The bodies of two of these students were never recovered.

Notable passengers

Prominent among the passenger victims was the 50-year-old UN Commissioner for Namibia (then South West Africa), Bernt Carlsson, who would have attended the signing ceremony of the New York Accords at the UN headquarters the following day. James Fuller, an American automotive executive who worked for Volkswagen, was returning home from a meeting with Volkswagen executives in Germany. Also aboard was Irish Olympic sailor Peter Dix and rock musician Paul Jeffreys and his wife.

US government officials
Aboard the flight were U.S. Department of State Diplomatic Security Service (DSS) Special Agents Daniel Emmett O'Connor and Ronald Albert Lariviere. Matthew Gannon, the Central Intelligence Agency's deputy station chief in Beirut, Lebanon, was sitting in seat 14J, which is located in the business class (branded as "Clipper Class") cabin. A group of US intelligence specialists was on board the flight. Their presence gave rise to speculations and conspiracy theories that one or more of them had been targeted.

Lockerbie residents
The property was completely destroyed and its two occupants were killed. Their bodies were never found. Several other houses and their foundations were destroyed, and 21 others were damaged beyond repair.

A family of four was killed when their house at 15 Sherwood Crescent exploded. A couple and their daughter were killed by the explosion in their house at 16 Sherwood Crescent. Their son witnessed a fireball engulfing his home from a neighbour's garage, where he had been repairing his sister's bicycle. The other Lockerbie residents who died were two widows aged 82 and 81, who also both lived in Sherwood Crescent; they were the two oldest victims of the disaster. The bodies of both 15 Sherwood Crescent children and both 16 Sherwood Crescent parents were never recovered.

Patrick Keegans, Lockerbie's Roman Catholic priest, was preparing to visit friends around 7:00 that evening with his mother, having recently been appointed a parish priest of the town. Keegans' house at 1 Sherwood Crescent was the only one on the street that was not either destroyed by the impact or gutted by fire. According to a BBC article on the fire published in 2018, Keegans had gone upstairs to make sure that he had hidden his mother's Christmas present, and recalls, "Immediately after that, there was an enormous explosion". The same source claims that, following this, "the shaking stopped and to his surprise he was uninjured". Keegans' mother was also unharmed, having been shielded from debris by a refrigerator-freezer.

Many of the passengers' relatives, most of them from the US, arrived there within days to identify the dead. Volunteers from Lockerbie set up and staffed canteens which stayed open 24 hours a day and offered relatives, soldiers, police officers, and social workers free sandwiches, hot meals, beverages, and counseling. The people of the town washed, dried, and ironed every piece of clothing that was found once the police had determined they were of no forensic value, so that as many items as possible could be returned to the relatives. The BBC's Scotland correspondent, Andrew Cassell, reported on the 10th anniversary of the bombing that the townspeople had "opened their homes and hearts" to the relatives, bearing their own losses "stoically and with enormous dignity", and that the bonds forged then continue to this day.

Prior alerts
Two alerts were released shortly before the bombing.

Helsinki warning
On 5 December 1988 (16 days prior to the attack), the US Federal Aviation Administration (FAA) issued a security bulletin saying that, on that day, a man with an Arabic accent had telephoned the US Embassy in  Helsinki, Finland, and told them that a Pan Am flight from Frankfurt to the United States would be blown up within the next two weeks by someone associated with the Abu Nidal Organization; he said a Finnish woman would carry the bomb on board as an unwitting courier.

The anonymous warning was taken seriously by the US government and the State Department cabled the bulletin to dozens of embassies. The FAA sent it to all US carriers, including Pan Am, which had charged each of the passengers a $5 security surcharge, promising a "program that will screen passengers, employees, airport facilities, baggage, and aircraft with unrelenting thoroughness"; the security team in Frankfurt found the warning under a pile of papers on a desk the day after the bombing. One of the Frankfurt security screeners, whose job was to spot explosive devices under X-ray, told ABC News that she had first learned what Semtex (a plastic explosive) was during her ABC interview 11 months after the bombing.

On 13 December, the warning was posted on bulletin boards in the US Embassy in Moscow and eventually distributed to the entire American community there, including journalists and businessmen.

PLO's warning
Just days before the bombing, security forces in European countries, including the UK, were put on alert after a warning from the Palestine Liberation Organization (PLO) that extremists might launch terrorist attacks to undermine the then-ongoing dialogue between the United States and the PLO.

Claims of responsibility

On the day of the bombing, the French Directorate-General for External Security was informed by their British counterpart that the UK suspected the Libyans to be behind the bombing.

According to a CIA analysis dated 22 December 1988, several groups were quick to claim responsibility in telephone calls in the United States and Europe:

 A male caller claimed that a group called the "Guardians of the Islamic Revolution" had destroyed the plane in retaliation for Iran Air Flight 655 being shot down by US forces in the Persian Gulf the previous July.
 A caller claiming to represent the Islamic Jihad Organization told ABC News in New York that the group had planted the bomb to commemorate Christmas.
Another caller claimed the plane had been downed by Mossad, the Israeli intelligence service.
The list's author noted, "We consider the claims from the Guardians of the Islamic Revolution as the most credible one received so far," but the analysis concluded, "We cannot assign responsibility for this tragedy to any terrorist group at this time. We anticipate that, as often happens, many groups will seek to claim credit."

Muammar Gaddafi took responsibility for the Lockerbie bombing and paid compensation to the victims' families in 2003, though he maintained that he had not ordered the attack. On 22 February 2011, during the Libyan Civil War, former Minister of Justice Mustafa Abdul Jalil stated in an interview with the Swedish newspaper Expressen that Gaddafi had personally ordered the bombing. Jalil claimed to possess "documents that prove [his allegations] and [that he is] ready to hand them over to the international criminal court."

In December 2013,  the original prime suspects in the bombing were revealed to have been the Popular Front for the Liberation of Palestine – General Command (PFLP-GC), a Syria-based group led by Ahmed Jibril. A flood of warnings immediately preceding the disaster had included one that read: 'team of Palestinians not associated with PLO intends to attack US targets in Europe. Time frame is present. Targets specified are Pan Am Airlines and US military bases.' Five weeks before this warning, Jibril's right-hand man, Haffez Dalkamoni, had been arrested in Frankfurt with a known bomb-maker, Marwen Khreesat. "Later US intelligence officials confirmed that members of the group had been monitoring Pan Am's facilities at Frankfurt airport. On Dalkamoni's account bombs made by Khreesat were at large somewhere." A deep-cover CIA agent was told by up to 15 high-level Syrian officials that the PFLP-GC was involved and that officials interacted with Jibril "on a constant basis". In 2014, an Iranian ex-spy asserted that Iran ordered the attack. The Iranian foreign ministry swiftly denied any involvement.

Investigation

Civil investigation

Crash site

The initial investigation into the crash site by Dumfries and Galloway Constabulary involved many helicopter surveys, satellite imaging, and a search of the area by police and soldiers. In total, 4 million pieces of wreckage were collected and registered on computer files. More than 10,000 pieces of debris were retrieved, tagged, and entered into a computer tracking system. The perpetrators had apparently intended the plane to crash into the sea, destroying any traceable evidence, but  its explosion over land left a trail of evidence.

The fuselage of the aircraft was reconstructed by air accident investigators, revealing a  hole consistent with an explosion in the forward cargo hold. Examination of the baggage containers revealed that the container nearest the hole had blackening, pitting, and severe damage, indicating a "high-energy event" had taken place inside it. A series of test explosions was carried out to confirm the precise location and quantity of explosive used.

Fragments of a Samsonite suitcase believed to have contained the bomb were recovered, together with parts and pieces of circuit board identified as components of a Toshiba 'Bombeat' RT-SF16, radio cassette player, similar to that used to conceal a Semtex bomb seized by West German police from the Palestinian militant group PLO-GC two months earlier. Items of baby clothing, which were subsequently proven to have been made in Malta, were thought to have come from the same suitcase.

Witnesses
The clothes were traced to a Maltese merchant, Tony Gauci, who became a key prosecution witness, testifying that he sold the clothes to a man of Libyan appearance. Gauci was interviewed 23 times, giving contradictory evidence about who had bought the clothes, that person's age and appearance, and the date of purchase, but later identified Abdelbaset al-Megrahi. As Megrahi had only been in Malta on 7 December, that date was assumed to be the purchase date. This date is in doubt, as Gauci had testified that Malta's Christmas lights had not been on when the clothes had been purchased; the lights were later found to have been switched on on 6 December. Scottish police had also failed to inform the defence that another witness had testified seeing Libyan men making a similar purchase on a different day. An official report, providing information not made available to the defence during the original trial, stated that on 19 April 1999, four days before identifying al-Megrahi for the first time, Gauci had seen a picture of al-Megrahi in a magazine that connected him to the bombing, a fact that could have distorted his judgement. Gauci was shown the same magazine during his testimony at al-Megrahi's trial and asked if he had identified the photograph in April 1999 as being the person who purchased the clothing; he was then asked if that person was in the court. Gauci then identified al-Megrahi for the court, stating, "He is the man on this side. He resembles him a lot".

A circuit board fragment, allegedly found embedded in a piece of charred material, was identified as part of an electronic timer similar to one found on a Libyan intelligence agent who had been arrested 10 months previously for carrying materials for a Semtex bomb. The timer was allegedly traced through its Swiss manufacturer, Mebo, to the Libyan military, and Mebo employee Ulrich Lumpert identified the fragment at al-Megrahi's trial. Mebo's owner, Edwin Bollier, testified at the trial that the Scottish police had originally shown him a fragment of a brown eight-ply circuit board from a prototype timer which had never been supplied to Libya. Yet the sample he was asked to identify at the trial was a green 9-ply circuit board that Mebo had indeed supplied to Libya. Bollier wanted to pursue this discrepancy, but was told by trial judge Lord Sutherland that he could not do so. Bollier claimed that in 1991 he had declined an offer of $4 million from the FBI (equivalent to $ million in  dollars) in exchange for his support of the main line of inquiry, though this claim has never been verified.

Criminal inquiry
Known as the Lockerbie bombing and the Lockerbie air disaster in the UK, it was described by Scotland's Lord Advocate as the UK's largest criminal inquiry led by the smallest police force in Britain, Dumfries and Galloway Constabulary.

After a three-year joint investigation by Dumfries and Galloway Constabulary and the US FBI, during which 15,000 witness statements were taken, indictments for murder were issued on 13 November 1991 against Abdelbaset al-Megrahi, a Libyan intelligence officer and the head of security for Libyan Arab Airlines (LAA), and Lamin Khalifah Fhimah, the LAA station manager in Luqa Airport, Malta. UN sanctions against Libya and protracted negotiations with Libyan leader Colonel Muammar Gaddafi secured the handover of the accused on 5 April 1999 to Scottish police at Camp Zeist, the Netherlands, which was selected as a neutral venue for their trial.

Both of the accused chose not to give evidence in court. On 31 January 2001, Megrahi was convicted of murder by a panel of three Scottish judges, and sentenced to life imprisonment, but Fhimah was acquitted. Megrahi's appeal against his conviction was refused on 14 March 2002, and his application to the European Court of Human Rights was declared inadmissible in July 2003. On 23 September 2003, Megrahi applied to the Scottish Criminal Cases Review Commission (SCCRC) for his conviction to be reviewed, and on 28 June 2007, the SCCRC announced its decision to refer the case to the High Court of Justiciary in Edinburgh after it found he "may have suffered a miscarriage of justice".

Megrahi served just over 10 years of his sentence (beginning 5 April 1999), first in Barlinnie prison, Glasgow, and later in Greenock prison, Renfrewshire, throughout which time he maintained that he was innocent of the charges against him. He was released from prison on compassionate grounds on 20 August 2009.

In October 2015, Scottish prosecutors announced that they wanted to interview two Libyan nationals, whom they had identified as new suspects, over the bombing.

On 21 December 2020, the 32nd anniversary of the disaster, the United States attorney general announced that Abu Agela Mas'ud Kheir Al-Marimi, a Libyan national in custody in Libya, had been charged with terrorism-related crimes in connection with the bombing, accusing him of involvement in constructing the bomb.

On 11 December 2022, the United States advised they had Abu Agila Mohammad Mas'ud Kheir Al-Marimi in custody.

Trial, appeals, and release

On 3 May 2000, the trial of Abdelbaset al-Megrahi and Lamin Khalifah Fhimah began. Megrahi was found guilty of 270 counts of murder on 31 January 2001, and was sentenced to life imprisonment in Scotland; his co-defendant, Fhimah, was found not guilty.

The Lockerbie judgment stated:

Appeal
The defence team had 14 days in which to appeal against Megrahi's conviction, and an additional six weeks to submit the full grounds of the appeal. These were considered by a judge sitting in private who decided to grant Megrahi leave to appeal. The only basis for an appeal under Scots law is that  a "miscarriage of justice" had occurred, which is not defined in statute, so  the appeal court must determine the meaning of these words in each case. Because three judges and one alternate judge had presided over the trial, five judges were required to preside over the Court of Criminal Appeal: Lord Cullen, Lord Justice-General, Lord Kirkwood, Lord Osborne, Lord Macfadyen, and Lord Nimmo Smith.

In what was described as a milestone in Scottish legal history, Lord Cullen granted the BBC permission in January 2002 to televise the appeal, and to broadcast it on the Internet in English with a simultaneous Arabic translation.

William Taylor QC, leading the defence, said at the appeal's opening on 23 January 2002 that the three trial judges sitting without a jury had failed to see the relevance of "significant" evidence and had accepted unreliable facts. He argued that the verdict was not one that a reasonable jury in an ordinary trial could have reached if it were given proper directions by the judge. The grounds of the appeal rested on two areas of evidence where the defence claimed the original court was mistaken: the evidence of Maltese shopkeeper, Tony Gauci, which the judges accepted as sufficient to prove that the "primary suitcase" started its journey in Malta; and, disputing the prosecution's case, fresh evidence would be adduced to show that the bomb's journey actually started at Heathrow. That evidence, which was not heard at the trial, showed that at some time in the two hours before 00:35 on 21 December 1988, a padlock had been forced on a secure door giving access air side in Terminal 3 of Heathrow airport, near to the area referred to at the trial as the "baggage build-up area". Taylor claimed that the PA 103 bomb could have been planted then.

On 14 March 2002, Lord Cullen took less than three minutes to deliver the decision of the High Court of Judiciary. The five judges rejected the appeal, ruling unanimously that "none of the grounds of appeal was well-founded", adding "this brings proceedings to an end". The following day, a helicopter took Megrahi from Camp Zeist to continue his life sentence in Barlinnie Prison, Glasgow.

SCCRC review
Megrahi's lawyers applied to the Scottish Criminal Cases Review Commission (SCCRC) on 23 September 2003 to have his case referred back to the Court of Criminal Appeal for a fresh appeal against conviction. The application to the SCCRC followed the publication of two reports in February 2001 and March 2002 by Hans Köchler, who had been an international observer at Camp Zeist, appointed by the Secretary-General of the United Nations. Köchler described the decisions of the trial and appeal courts as a "spectacular miscarriage of justice". Köchler also issued a series of statements in 2003, 2005, and 2007 calling for an independent international inquiry into the case and accusing the West of "double standards in criminal justice" in relation to the Lockerbie trial on the one hand and the HIV trial in Libya on the other.

On 28 June 2007, the SCCRC announced its decision to refer Megrahi's case to the High Court for a second appeal against conviction. The SCCRC's decision was based on facts set out in an 800-page report that determined that "a miscarriage of justice may have occurred". Köchler criticised the SCCRC for exonerating police, prosecutors and forensic staff from blame in respect of Megrahi's alleged wrongful conviction. He told The Herald of 29 June 2007: "No officials to be blamed, simply a Maltese shopkeeper." Köchler also highlighted the role of intelligence services in the trial and stated that proper judicial proceedings could not be conducted under conditions in which extrajudicial forces are allowed to intervene.

Second appeal
A procedural hearing at the Appeal Court took place on 11 October 2007 when prosecution lawyers and Megrahi's defence counsel, Maggie Scott QC, discussed a number of legal issues with a panel of three judges. One of the issues concerned a number of documents that were shown before the trial to the prosecution, but were not disclosed to the defence. The documents are understood to relate to the Mebo MST-13 timer that allegedly detonated the PA103 bomb. Maggie Scott also asked for documents relating to an alleged payment of $2 million made to Maltese merchant, Tony Gauci, for his testimony at the trial, which led to the conviction of Megrahi.

On 15 October 2008, five Scottish judges decided unanimously to reject a submission by the Crown Office, which sought to limit the scope of Megrahi's second appeal to the specific grounds of appeal that were identified by the SCCRC in June 2007. In January 2009, it was reported that, although Megrahi's second appeal against conviction was scheduled to begin in April 2009, the hearing could last as long as 12 months because of the complexity of the case and volume of material to be examined. The second appeal began on 28 April 2009, lasted for one month and was adjourned in May 2009. On 7 July 2009, the court reassembled for a procedural hearing and was told that because of the illness of one of the judges, Lord Wheatley, who was recovering from heart surgery, the final two substantive appeal sessions would run from 2 November to 11 December 2009, and 12 January to 26 February 2010. Megrahi's lawyer Maggie Scott expressed dismay at the delays: "There is a very serious danger that my client will die before the case is determined."

Compassionate release and controversy

On 25 July 2009, Megrahi applied to be released from jail on compassionate grounds. Three weeks later, on 12 August 2009, Megrahi applied to have his second appeal dropped and was granted compassionate release for his terminal prostate cancer. On 20 August 2009, Megrahi was released from prison and travelled by chartered jet to Libya.
His survival beyond the approximate "three-month" prognosis generated some controversy. It is believed that, following his release, Al-Megrahi was prescribed abiraterone and prednisone, a combination that extends median survival by an average of 14.8 months. After hospital treatment ended, he returned to his family home. Following his release, Megrahi published evidence on the Internet that was gathered for the abandoned second appeal which he claimed would clear his name.

Allegations have been made that the UK government and BP sought Al-Megrahi's release as part of a trade deal with Libya. In 2008, the UK government "decided to 'do all it could' to help the Libyans get Al-Megrahi home ... and explained the legal procedure for compassionate release to the Libyans."

Megrahi was released on licence, so was obliged to remain in regular contact with East Renfrewshire Council. On 26 August 2011, it was announced that the whereabouts of Al-Megrahi were unknown due to the social upheaval in Libya and that he had not been in contact for some time. As reported on 29 August, he had been located and both the Scottish government and council issued a statement confirming that they had been in contact with his family and that his licence had not been breached. MP Andrew Mitchell said Al-Megrahi was comatose and near death. CNN reporter Nic Robertson said he was "just a shell of the man he once was" and was surviving on oxygen and an intravenous drip. In an interview on BBC Radio 5 Live, former US ambassador to the United Nations John Bolton called for Al-Megrahi to be extradited.

To me it will be a signal of how serious the rebel government is for good relations with the United States and the West if they hand over Megrahi for trial.

Mohammed al-Alagi, justice minister for the new leadership in Tripoli, said "the council would not allow any Libyan to be deported to face trial in another country ... Abdelbaset al-Megrahi has already been judged once, and will not be judged again." Megrahi died of prostate cancer in Libya on 20 May 2012. Scottish First Minister Alex Salmond said that people should use the occasion to remember the Lockerbie victims.

Abu Agila Mohammad Mas'ud Kheir Al-Marimi
In 2020, US authorities indicted Libyan national, Abu Agila Mohammad Mas'ud Kheir Al-Marimi, for participating in the bombing. In December 2022, the United States government obtained custody of 71-year-old Mas'ud.

According to The New York Times, Mas'ud was born in Tunisia in 1951, before he became a citizen of Libya as a child after he moved to Tripoli, Libya. Beginning at the age of 22 in 1973, he began working with bombs for the Libyan intelligence service for the next 38 years. Shortly after finishing his longtime run at the job, Mas'ud was arrested and imprisoned in Misurata, Libya before being moved to Al-Hadba prison in Tripoli, which happened shortly after the fall of Colonel el-Qaddafi in 2011.

After the United States government obtained custody of Mas'ud, heads of the Defense and Foreign Affairs Committees of the Libyan Parliament, Talal al-Mihoub and Youssef al-Aqouri, demanded an urgent investigation into the extradition of Mas'ud, calling it a blatant violation of national sovereignty and an infringement of the rights of the Libyan citizen. They stressed that the case file had been completely closed politically and legally, according to the text of the agreement signed between the United States and Libya in 2003.

Alleged motives

Libya

Until 2002, Libya had never formally admitted carrying out the 1988 Lockerbie bombing. On 16 August 2003, Libya formally admitted responsibility for Pan Am Flight 103 in a letter presented to the president of the United Nations Security Council. Felicity Barringer of The New York Times said that the letter had "general language that lacked any expression of remorse" for the people killed in the bombing. The letter stated that it "accepted responsibility for the actions of its officials".

The motive that is generally attributed to Libya can be traced back to a series of military confrontations with the US Navy that took place in the 1980s in the Gulf of Sidra, the whole of which Libya claimed as its territorial waters. First, there was the Gulf of Sidra incident (1981) when two Libyan fighter aircraft were shot down by two US Navy F-14 Tomcat fighters. Then, two Libyan radio ships were sunk in the Gulf of Sidra. Later, on 23 March 1986, a Libyan Navy patrol boat was sunk in the Gulf of Sidra, followed by the sinking of another Libyan vessel on 25 March 1986. The Libyan leader, Muammar Gaddafi, was accused of retaliating for these sinkings by ordering the April 1986 bombing of La Belle, a West Berlin nightclub frequented by US military personnel, killing three people and injuring 230.

The US National Security Agency's (NSA) alleged interception of an incriminatory message from Libya to its embassy in East Berlin provided US President Ronald Reagan with the justification for Operation El Dorado Canyon on 15 April 1986, with US Navy and US Marine Corps warplanes launching from three aircraft carriers in the Gulf of Sidra and US Air Force warplanes launching from two British bases—the first US military strikes from Britain since World War II—against Tripoli and Benghazi in Libya. The Libyan government claimed the air strikes killed Hana Gaddafi, a daughter Gaddafi claimed he adopted (her reported age has varied between 15 months and seven years). To avenge his daughter's supposed death (Hana or Hanna's actual fate remains disputed), Gaddafi is said to have sponsored the September 1986 hijacking of Pan Am Flight 73 in Karachi, Pakistan.

In turn, the US encouraged the Chadian National Armed Forces (FANT) and it also aided them by supplying them with satellite intelligence during the Battle of Maaten al-Sarra. The attack resulted in a devastating defeat for Gaddafi's forces, following which he had to accede to a ceasefire ending the Chadian-Libyan conflict and his dreams of African dominance. Gaddafi blamed the defeat on French and US "aggression against Libya". The result was Gaddafi's lingering animosity against the two countries which led to Libyan support for the bombings of Pan Am Flight 103 and UTA Flight 772.

Demands for independent inquiry
Prior to the abandonment of Megrahi's second appeal against conviction and while new evidence could be still tested in court, there had been few calls for an independent inquiry into the Lockerbie bombing. Demands for such an inquiry emerged later, and became more insistent. On 2 September 2009, former MEP Michael McGowan demanded that the UK government call for an urgent, independent inquiry led by the UN to find out the truth about Pan Am flight 103. "We owe it to the families of the victims of Lockerbie and the international community to identify those responsible," McGowan said. Two online petitions were started: one calling for a UK public inquiry into the Lockerbie bombing; the other a UN inquiry into the murder of UN Commissioner for Namibia, Bernt Carlsson, in the 1988 Lockerbie bombing. In September 2009, a third petition which was addressed to the President of the United Nations General Assembly demanded that the UN should "institute a full public inquiry" into the Lockerbie disaster. On 3 October 2009, Malta was asked to table a UN resolution supporting the petition, which was signed by 20 people including the families of the Lockerbie victims, authors, journalists, professors, politicians and parliamentarians, as well as Archbishop Desmond Tutu. The signatories considered that a UN inquiry could help remove "many of the deep misgivings which persist in lingering over this tragedy" and could also eliminate Malta from this terrorist act. Malta was brought into the case because the prosecution argued that the two accused Libyans, Abdelbaset al-Megrahi and Lamin Khalifah Fhimah, had placed the bomb on an Air Malta aircraft before it was transferred at Frankfurt airport to a feeder flight destined for London's Heathrow airport, from which Pan Am Flight 103 departed. The Maltese government responded saying that the demand for a UN inquiry was "an interesting development that would be deeply considered, although there were complex issues surrounding the event."

On 24 August 2009, Lockerbie campaigner Dr Jim Swire wrote to Prime Minister, Gordon Brown, calling for a full inquiry, including the question of suppression of the Heathrow evidence. This was backed up by a delegation of Lockerbie relatives, led by Pamela Dix, who went to 10 Downing Street on 24 October 2009 and handed over a letter addressed to Gordon Brown calling for a meeting with the Prime Minister to discuss the need for a public inquiry and the main issues that it should address. An op-ed article by Pamela Dix, subtitled "The families of those killed in the bombing have not given up hope of an inquiry to help us learn the lessons of this tragedy", was published in The Guardian on 26 October 2009. On 1 November 2009, it was reported that Gordon Brown had ruled out a public inquiry into Lockerbie, saying in response to Dr Swire's letter: "I understand your desire to understand the events surrounding the bombing of Pan Am flight 103 but I do not think it would be appropriate for the UK government to open an inquiry of this sort." UK ministers explained that it was for the Scottish Government to decide if it wants to hold its own, more limited, inquiry into the worst terrorist attack on British soil. The Scottish Government had already rejected an independent inquiry, saying it lacks the constitutional power to examine the international dimensions of the case.

Concluding his extensive reply dated 27 October 2009 to the Prime Minister, Dr Swire said:

Claims of Gaddafi involvement

On 23 February 2011, amidst the Libyan Civil War, Mustafa Abdul Jalil, former Libyan Justice Minister (and later member and Chairman of the anti-Gaddafi National Transitional Council), alleged that he had evidence that Libyan leader, Muammar Gaddafi, had personally ordered Abdelbaset al-Megrahi to bomb Pan Am Flight 103.

In a July 2021 interview, Gaddafi's son Saif al-Islam said that his father "had stopped riding his horse after the humiliation of the American bombing of Tripoli in 1986 and resumed riding it after the Lockerbie bombing."

Alternative theories

Based on a 1995 investigation by journalists Paul Foot and John Ashton, alternative explanations of the plot to commit the Lockerbie bombing were listed by The Guardian'''s Patrick Barkham in 1999. Following the Lockerbie verdict in 2001 and the appeal in 2002, attempts have been made to re-open the case amid allegations that Libya was framed. One theory suggests the bomb on the plane was detonated by radio. Another theory suggests the CIA prevented the suitcase containing the bomb from being searched. Iran's involvement is alleged, either in association with a Palestine militant group, or in loading the bomb while the plane was at Heathrow. The US Defense Intelligence Agency alleges that Ali Akbar Mohtashamipur (Ayatollah Mohtashemi), a member of the Iranian government, paid US$10 million for the bombing:

Other theories implicate Libya and Abu Nidal, and apartheid South Africa.

French investigative journalist Pierre Péan accused Thomas Thurman, a Federal Bureau of Investigation explosives expert, of fabricating false evidence against Libya in both the Pan Am Flight 103 and UTA Flight 772 sabotages.

PCAST statement
On 29 September 1989, President Bush appointed Ann McLaughlin Korologos, former Secretary of Labor, to chair the President's Commission on Aviation Security and Terrorism (PCAST) to review and report on aviation security policy in the light of the sabotage of flight PA103. Oliver Revell, the FBI's Executive Assistant Director, was assigned to advise and assist PCAST in their task.

Before they submitted their report, the PCAST members met a group of British PA103 relatives at the US embassy in London on 12 February 1990. One of the British relatives, Martin Cadman, alleges that a member of President Bush's staff told him: "Your government and ours know exactly what happened but they are never going to tell." The statement first came to public attention in the 1994 documentary film The Maltese Double Cross – Lockerbie and was published in both The Guardian of 12 November 1994, and a special report from Private Eye magazine entitled Lockerbie, the flight from justice May/June 2001.

Compensation

From Libya
On 29 May 2002, Libya offered up to US$2.7 billion to settle claims by the families of the 270 killed in the Lockerbie bombing, representing US$10 million per family. The Libyan offer was that 40% of the money would be released when United Nations sanctions, suspended in 1999, were cancelled; another 40% when US trade sanctions were lifted; and the final 20% when the US State Department removed Libya from its list of states sponsoring terrorism.

Jim Kreindler of the New York law firm Kreindler & Kreindler, which orchestrated the settlement, said: "These are uncharted waters. It is the first time that any of the states designated as sponsors of terrorism have offered compensation to families of terror victims." The US State Department maintained that it was not directly involved. "Some families want cash, others say it is blood money", said a State Department official.

Compensation for the families of the PA103 victims was among the steps set by the UN for lifting its sanctions against Libya. Other requirements included a formal denunciation of terrorism—which Libya said it had already made—and "accepting responsibility for the actions of its officials".

On 15 August 2003, Libya's UN ambassador, Ahmed Own, submitted a letter to the UN Security Council formally accepting "responsibility for the actions of its officials" in relation to the Lockerbie bombing. The Libyan government then proceeded to pay compensation to each family of US$8 million (from which legal fees of about US$2.5 million were deducted) and, as a result, the UN cancelled the sanctions that had been suspended four years earlier, and US trade sanctions were lifted. A further US$2 million would have gone to each family had the US State Department removed Libya from its list of states regarded as supporting international terrorism, but as this did not happen by the deadline set by Libya, the Libyan Central Bank withdrew the remaining US$540 million in April 2005 from the escrow account in Switzerland through which the earlier US$2.16 billion compensation for the victims' families had been paid. The United States announced resumption of full diplomatic relations with Libya after deciding to remove it from its list of countries that support terrorism on 15 May 2006.

On 24 February 2004, Libyan Prime Minister Shukri Ghanem stated in a BBC Radio 4 interview that his country had paid the compensation as the "price for peace" and to secure the lifting of sanctions. Asked if Libya did not accept guilt, he said, "I agree with that." He also said there was no evidence to link Libya with the April 1984 shooting of police officer Yvonne Fletcher outside the Libyan Embassy in London. Gaddafi later retracted Ghanem's comments, under pressure from Washington and London.

A civil action against Libya continued until 18 February 2005 on behalf of Pan Am and its insurers, which went bankrupt partly as a result of the attack. The airline was seeking $4.5 billion for the loss of the aircraft and the effect on the airline's business.

In the wake of the SCCRC's June 2007 decision, there have been suggestions that, if Megrahi's second appeal had been successful and his conviction had been overturned, Libya could have sought to recover the $2.16 billion compensation paid to the relatives. Interviewed by French newspaper Le Figaro on 7 December 2007, Saif al-Islam Gaddafi said that the seven Libyans convicted for the Pan Am Flight 103 and the UTA Flight 772 bombings "are innocent". When asked if Libya would therefore seek reimbursement of the compensation paid to the families of the victims (US$33 billion in total), Saif Gaddafi replied: "I don't know".

Following discussions in London in May 2008, US and Libyan officials agreed to start negotiations to resolve all outstanding bilateral compensation claims, including those relating to UTA Flight 772, the 1986 Berlin discotheque bombing and Pan Am Flight 103. On 14 August 2008, a US-Libya compensation deal was signed in Tripoli by US Assistant Secretary of State David Welch and Libya's Foreign Ministry head of America affairs, Ahmed al-Fatroui. The agreement covers 26 lawsuits filed by American citizens against Libya, and three by Libyan citizens in respect of the US bombing of Tripoli and Benghazi in April 1986 which killed at least 40 people and injured 220. In October 2008 Libya paid $1.5 billion into a fund which will be used to compensate relatives of the

 Lockerbie bombing victims with the remaining 20% of the sum agreed in 2003;
 American victims of the 1986 Berlin discotheque bombing;
 American victims of the 1989 UTA Flight 772 bombing; and,
 Libyan victims of the 1986 US bombing of Tripoli and Benghazi.

As a result, President Bush signed  restoring the Libyan government's immunity from terror-related lawsuits and dismissing all of the pending compensation cases in the US, the White House said. US State Department spokesman, Sean McCormack, called the move a "laudable milestone ... clearing the way for a continued and expanding US-Libyan partnership."

In an interview shown in BBC Two's The Conspiracy Files: Lockerbie on 31 August 2008, Saif Gaddafi said that Libya had admitted responsibility for the Lockerbie bombing simply to get trade sanctions removed. He went on to describe the families of the Lockerbie victims as very greedy: "They were asking for more money and more money and more money". Several of the victims families refused to accept compensation due to their belief that Libya was not responsible.

February 2011
In an interview with Swedish newspaper Expressen on 23 February 2011, Mustafa Abdul Jalil, former Justice Secretary of Libya, claimed to have evidence that Gaddafi personally ordered Al-Megrahi to carry out the bombing.

Quotes: "[Jalil] told Expressen Khadafy [sic] gave the order to Abdel Baset al-Megrahi, the only man convicted in the bombing of Pan Am Flight 103 over Lockerbie, Scotland, which killed all 259 people on board and 11 on the ground on 21 December 1988.
'To hide it, he (Khadafy) did everything in his power to get al-Megrahi back from Scotland,' Abdel-Jalil was quoted as saying."

Al Jalil's commentary to the Expressen came during widespread political unrest and protests in Libya calling for the removal of Ghaddafi from power. The protests were part of a massive wave of unprecedented uprisings across the Arab world in: Tunisia, Morocco, Bahrain and Egypt, where Egyptian protesters effectively forced the removal of long-term ruler, Hosni Mubarak, from office. Jalil's comments came on a day when Ghaddafi's defiance and refusal to leave his command prompted his brutal attacks on Libyan protesters.

Abdel-Jalil stepped down as minister of justice in protest over the violence against anti-government demonstrations.

Contingency fees for lawyers
On 5 December 2003, Jim Kreindler revealed that his Park Avenue law firm would receive an initial contingency fee of around US$1 million from each of the 128 American families Kreindler represents. The firm's fees could exceed US$300 million eventually. Kreindler argued that the fees were justified, since "Over the past seven years we have had a dedicated team working tirelessly on this and we deserve the contingency fee we have worked so hard for, and I think we have provided the relatives with value for money."

Another top legal firm in the US, Speiser Krause, which represented 60 relatives, of whom half were UK families, concluded contingency deals securing them fees of between 28 and 35% of individual settlements. Frank Granito of Speiser Krause noted that "the rewards in the US are more substantial than anywhere else in the world but nobody has questioned the fee whilst the work has been going on, it is only now as we approach a resolution when the criticism comes your way."

In March 2009, it was announced that US lobbying firm, Quinn Gillespie & Associates, received fees of $2 million for the work it did from 2006 through 2008 helping the PA103 relatives obtain payment by Libya of the final $2 million compensation (out of a total of $10 million) that was due to each family.

From Pan Am
In 1992, a US federal court found Pan Am guilty of willful misconduct due to lax security screening caused by not implementing baggage reconciliation, a new security program mandated by the FAA prior to the incident, which requires unaccompanied luggage to be searched by hand and to ensure passengers board flights onto which they have checked baggage; Pan Am relied more on the less-effective method of x-ray screening. Two of Pan Am's subsidiaries, Alert Management Inc., which handles Pan Am's security at foreign airports, and Pan American World Services, were also found guilty.

Memorials and tributes

There are several private and public memorials to the PA103 victims. Dark Elegy is the work of sculptor Suse Lowenstein of Long Island, whose son Alexander, then 21, was a passenger on the flight. The work consists of 43 nude statues of the wives and mothers who lost a husband or a child. Inside each sculpture there is a personal memento of the victim.

United States

On 3 November 1995, then-US President Bill Clinton dedicated a Memorial Cairn to the victims at Arlington National Cemetery, and there are similar memorials at Syracuse University; Dryfesdale Cemetery, near Lockerbie; and in Sherwood Crescent, Lockerbie.

Syracuse University holds a memorial week every year called "Remembrance Week" to commemorate its 35 lost students. Every 21 December, a service is held in the university's chapel at 14:03 (19:03 UTC), marking the moment the bomb on board the aircraft was detonated. The university also awards university tuition fees to two students from Lockerbie Academy each year, in the form of its Lockerbie scholarship. In addition, the university annually awards 35 scholarships to seniors to honour each of the 35 students killed.Remembrance Scholarships at Syracuse University. The "Remembrance Scholarships" are among the highest honors a Syracuse undergraduate can receive. SUNY Oswego also gives out scholarships in memorial of Colleen Brunner to a student who is studying abroad. A memorial plaque and garden in memory of its two students lost in the bombing is set in the University of Rochester's Eastman Quadrangle.
 At Cornell University funds from the Libyan payment were used to establish a memorial professorship in honor of student Kenneth J. Bissett.

 The Women of Lockerbie The Women of Lockerbie (2003) is a play written by Deborah Brevoort which depicts a woman from New Jersey roaming the hills of Lockerbie, Scotland.  This mother tragically lost her son in the bombing of the Pan Am Flight 103.  While in Lockerbie, 7 years after the flight, she meets the women who witnessed and were affected by the crash itself while she attempts to find closure. This play has received the Silver Medal from the Onassis International Playwriting Competition and the Kennedy Center Fund for New American Plays award.

Lockerbie

There is a semicircular stone wall in the garden of remembrance with the names and nationalities of all the victims along with individual funeral stones and memorials. Inside the chapel at Dryfesdale there is a book of remembrance. There are memorials in Lockerbie and Moffat Roman Catholic churches, where plaques list the names of all 270 victims. In Lockerbie Town Hall Council Chambers, there is a stained-glass window depicting flags of the 21 countries whose citizens lost their lives in the disaster. There is also a book of remembrance at Lockerbie public library and another at Tundergarth Church. In Sherwood Crescent there is a garden of remembrance to the seven Lockerbie residents killed when the aircraft's main wreckage fell there, destroying their homes.

Wreckage of the aircraft
The Air Accidents Investigation Branch reassembled a large part of the fuselage to aid with the investigation; this has been retained as evidence and stored in a hangar at Farnborough Airport since the bombing.

As of 2008, the remaining wreckage of the aircraft was stored about a mile from Tattershall, Lincolnshire, at Roger Windley's scrapyard, pending the conclusion of the American victims' civil case and further legal proceedings. The remains include the nose section of the Boeing 747, which was cut into several pieces to assist in removal from Tundergarth Hill.

It was announced in April 2013 that part of the wreckage was transferred to a secure location in Dumfries, Scotland, and that it remains evidence in the ongoing criminal investigation.

In popular culture
The events of Flight 103 were featured in "Lockerbie Disaster", a Season 7 (2009) episode of the Canadian TV series Mayday (called Air Emergency and Air Disasters in the US and Air Crash Investigation in the UK and elsewhere around the world). It is also featured in a documentary film The Maltese Double Cross – Lockerbie.

The bombing is also compared with the death of actor Brandon Lee on the track “Gold” off of hip-hop artist GZA’s 1995 album Liquid Swords, in the lyric, "Snake got smoked on the set like Brandon Lee, blown out the frame like Pan Am Flight 103." The book The Boy Who Fell Out of the Sky by Ken Dornstein was published about his brother who died in the crash.

See also
 Air India Flight 182Another terrorist bombing over the Atlantic Ocean en route to London over Irish airspace
 Alas Chiricanas Flight 901
 Libyan Arab Airlines Flight 1103, allegedly shot down by order of Muammar Gaddafi in order to show the negative effects of the sanctions which were imposed on Libya after the bombing of Flight 103
 Itavia Flight 870
 Metrojet Flight 9268
 List of accidents and incidents involving commercial aircraft
 Timeline of airliner bombing attacks
 Cubana Flight 455
 1933 United Airlines Boeing 247 mid-air explosion, the first confirmed case of an aircraft bombing. 

References

 Further reading 

 
 
 
  
 
 
 
 
 
 
 
 
 The Scottish indictment against Megrahi and Fhimah, 13 November 1991. Retrieved 27 February 2005
 The U.S. indictment against Megrahi and Fhimah , 13 November 1991. Retrieved 26 February 2005
 The Scottish judges . Retrieved 26 February 2005
 The verdict against Megrahi and Fhimah , issued 31 January 2001. Retrieved 26 February 2005
 "No:2/9Boeing 747-121, N739PA, at Lockerbie, Dumfriesshire, Scotland", Air Accident Investigation Branch (AAIB) report. Retrieved 27 February 2005
 The position of the bomb, AAIB report, Appendix F (pdf). Retrieved 27 February 2005
 "Mach stem shock wave effects", AAIB report, Appendix G (pdf). Retrieved 27 February 2005
 Aviation Safety Network summary report. Retrieved 27 February 2005
 Graphic of how the aircraft was destroyed, Aviation Safety Network. Retrieved 27 February 2005
 The cost of the trial. Retrieved 26 February 2005
 The judgment in Megrahi's appeal , 14 March 2002. Retrieved 26 February 2005
 United Nations Security Council Resolution 731 (1992) , 21 January 1992. Retrieved 26 February 2005
 United Nations Security Council Resolution 748 (1992) , 21 January 1992. Retrieved 26 February 2005
 United Nations Security Council Resolution 883 (1993) , 11 November 1993. Retrieved 26 February 2005
 In-depth pages on the trial, BBC News. Retrieved 26 February 2005
 "Lessons from Lockerbie, ten years later", BBC News. Retrieved 26 February 2005
 The Lockerbie Trial. Retrieved 29 December 2008
 
 "Time Trail: Lockerbie", a collection of stories about the bombing from Time Magazine. Retrieved 25 February 2005
 "Lockerbie appeal hears key witness", BBC News, 13 February 2002. Retrieved 26 February 2005
 "Lockerbie bomber loses appeal", BBC News, 14 March 2002. Retrieved 26 February 2005
 "Lockerbie bomber to fight jail move", by Lucy Adams, The Herald, 25 February 2005. Retrieved 26 February 2005
 Website set up by supporters of Megrahi, not recently updated. Retrieved 27 February 2005
 Abu Nidal behind Lockerbie, says aide, CNN, 23 August 2002. Retrieved 27 February 2005
 "Court told how jet's radar blip broke up at 7.02 pm" by Ian Black and Gerard Seenan, 4 May 2000, The Guardian. Retrieved 28 February 2005
 
 
 
 
 "Flight 103," ABC News Prime Time Live, 30 November 1989
 
 
 "Timer admission in Lockerbie trial" by Gerard Seenan, 21 June 2000
 Mr. Waldegrave, "House of Commons Hansard Debates" in The United Kingdom Parliament, 19 April 1990. Retrieved 16 June 2005
 
 Koechler, H., and Jason Subler (eds.), The Lockerbie Trial. Documents Related to the I.P.O. Observer Mission. Studies in International Relations, Vol. XXVII. Vienna: International Progress Organization, 2002, .
 "Scottish Court in the Netherlands 2000–2002", Web site documenting the observer mission of Dr. Hans Koechler, appointed by UN Secretary-General Kofi Annan as international observer at the Lockerbie trial, regularly updated, International Progress Organization. Retrieved 2005

 Kreindler, James P., The Lockerbie Case and its Implications for State-Sponsored Terrorism, in: Israel Journal of Foreign Affairs, Vol. 1, No. 2 (2007)
 Haldane, Jill S., An' then the world came tae oor doorstep: Lockerbie Lives and Stories'' (The Grimsay Press, 2008). 
 News.bbc.co.uk. "Lockerbie pair 'could have survived'

External links

 Pan Am 103 Lockerbie Air Disaster Archives at Syracuse University

 Air Accident Investigation Branch: 
 Aircraft Accident Report 2/1990 – Report on the accident to Boeing 747-121, N739PA, at Lockerbie, Dumfriesshire, Scotland on 21 December 1988."
 2/1990 Aircraft Accident Report 2/1990, Appendices A–G
 BBC-online interview with Jaswant Basuta
 Byte Out Of History: Solving a complex case of international terrorism Federal Bureau of Investigation
 Defense Intelligence Agency Redacted Pan Am Report (response to a FOIA, 11 MB PDF) (Archive)
 
 International observer mission of the president of the International Progress Organization, Dr. Hans Koechler, at the Scottish Court in the Netherlands ("Lockerbie Court")
 Victims of Pan Am Flight 103, Inc.

 
1988 in Scotland
1988 disasters in the United Kingdom
1988 murders in the United Kingdom
1988 in international relations
20th-century mass murder in the United Kingdom
December 1988 crimes
December 1988 events in the United Kingdom
Aviation accidents and incidents in 1988
Mass murder in 1988
Terrorist incidents in the United Kingdom in 1988
Improvised explosive device bombings in 1988
Airliner bombings
Aviation accidents and incidents in Scotland
Accidents and incidents involving the Boeing 747
Diplomatic incidents
103
Explosions in Scotland
Massacres in Scotland
Terrorist incidents in Scotland
Improvised explosive device bombings in the United Kingdom
Improvised explosive device bombings in Scotland
Libya and the United Nations
Libya–United Kingdom relations
Libya–United States relations
Libya–Netherlands relations
Netherlands–United Kingdom relations
Netherlands–United States relations
United Kingdom–United States relations
Muammar Gaddafi
Margaret Thatcher
Presidency of Ronald Reagan
Anti-Americanism
History of Dumfries and Galloway
Lockerbie